St. Aloysius Gonzaga Secondary School is a Catholic high school located in the Erin Mills community of Mississauga, Ontario, named after Saint Aloysius Gonzaga. The school opened in Mississauga in 2001, after spending a year as a holding school in Georgetown. It is a joint venture between the city of Mississauga and the Dufferin Peel Catholic District School Board. According to the Fraser Institute, it is currently ranked 2nd in the Dufferin Peel Catholic District School Board behind St. Marcellinus Secondary School, 5th in Mississauga and 32nd out of 623 high schools in Ontario.

History 

St. Aloysius Gonzaga Secondary School was established in 2000 in a holding school in Georgetown.  The new school was built at 2800 Erin Centre Boulevard and was opened and blessed in 2001.

It is part of Erin Meadows Multi-use Complex, a partnership between the City of Mississauga, the Mississauga Library System, and the board.  The advanced-concept building includes a substantial library and a community centre complete with a swimming pool.  Students are able to access the community library and can use the community centre facilities as part of their program.

Gonzaga, which has over 1800 students, has a significant number of programs that accommodate academic and special needs students.  Integrated in the programs are Career Paths (vocational) program, ASD (Autism Spectrum Disorder) program, Advanced Placement (AP) program, and Extended French program for selected students across the board.

The school is across the street from Merciful Redeemer Parish where students attend Mass at the church.  Some school retreats are held at the parish, and students are involved in many parish ministries and the parish's Life Teen program.

Description

Gonzaga is part of Erin Meadows Multi-use Complex, a partnership between the City of Mississauga, the Mississauga Library System, and the board.  The advanced-concept building includes a substantial library and a community centre complete with swimming pool.  Students are able to access the community library and can use the community centre facilities as part of their program.

Gonzaga, which has over 1800 students, has a significant number of programs that accommodate academic and special needs students.  Integrated in the programs are ASD (Autism Spectrum Disorder) program, Advanced Placement (AP) program, and Extended French program for selected students across the board.

The school is across the street from Merciful Redeemer Parish, where students can attend Mass.
The geographic proximity of the school to our Parish, Merciful Redeemer, has helped to create close ties between the school and parish communities. Some school retreats are held at the parish, and students are involved in many parish ministries and the parish's Life Teen program

St. Aloysius Gonzaga Secondary School currently has a TV studio and editing room, auto centre, construction department, greenhouse, music room, dance studio, drama stage and theatre, and a weight lifting room. The atrium, community meeting rooms, library, and swimming pool are shared with the City of Mississauga.

Feeder Schools 
The elementary schools that St. Aloysius Gonzaga derives the majority of its new students are from:
 Divine Mercy
 Our Lady of Mercy
 St. Elizabeth Seton
 St. Joseph
 St. Rose of Lima (Extended French students)
 St. Therese of the Child Jesus (Extended French students)
 San Lorenzo Ruiz (Extended French students)

House system 
St. Aloysius Gonzaga has a house system implemented of which students score house points for participating in academic and extra-curricular achievements at the school, and help around the local community. All students are randomly sorted into one of the 10 Gonzaga Houses for his/her high school career once entering Grade 9. These houses include Strength (Yellow), Courage (White), Faith (Burgundy), Challenge (Red), Truth (Silver), Justice (Gold), Peace (Orange), Dreams (Sky Blue), Perseverance (Green), and Leadership (Royal Blue).
2005 Champions – Leadership House
2006 Champions – Perseverance House
2007 Champions – Truth House
2008 Champions – Strength House
2009 Champions – Faith House
2010 Champions – Strength House
2011 Champions – Faith House
2012 Champions – Strength House
2013 Champions – Dreams House
2016 Champions – Courage House

Athletics 
The 23 sports teams offered by St Aloysius Gonzaga range from varsity teams, to group teams and intramurals. The varsity girls hockey team winning OFSAA in 2013. The school offers: senior and junior boys hockey, varsity girls hockey, senior and junior boys volleyball, senior and junior girls volleyball, senior and junior boys basketball, senior and junior girls basketball, intramural basketball, senior and junior boys soccer, intramural soccer, senior and junior boys football, girls flag football, baseball varsity boys, softball varsity girls, cricket, curling, swimming, dance, golf, tennis, lacrosse, cross country, and track and field.

Clubs and organizations 
St. Aloysius Gonzaga offers many clubs and organizations to all students. With 40 total clubs and organizations, ranging in wide variety from one club to the next, there are many for students to choose from. Clubs and organizations offered to students include: Chaplaincy's "Addicted to Change" and Christmas Basket Creation Club, AV Club, Chess Club, Culinary Club, Dance Club, DECA (Business) Organization, Dragon Boat Racing, Games Club, Health Club, Lifeline Organization, Gonzaga Players (Drama and Acting) Club, Student Prefects, Graduation Committee, Green Scene, Harry Potter Club, JAG (Junior Achievement) Organization, Law Club, Math Club, Modern Languages Club, Music Department (Including Concert Band/Choir, Symphonic Band, Guitar/Wind Ensembles, and Jazz Band/Choir), OSAID (Ontario Students Against Impaired Driving), Outreach Organization, Photography Club, Reading Club, Robotics Club, Safe at Gonzaga Organization, Science Club, Sewing Club, Spanish Club, Model United Nations, and Yearbook Committee.

Notable alumni
Robby Fabbri, ice hockey player
David Broll, ice hockey player
Oshae Brissett, basketball player

See also

List of high schools in Ontario

References

External links 
Official School website

Educational institutions established in 2000
Educational institutions established in 2001
High schools in Mississauga
Catholic secondary schools in Ontario
2000 establishments in Ontario
2001 establishments in Ontario